McLeish is a surname. Notable people with the surname include:

Adam McLeish, British sportsman in Snowboarding
Alex McLeish (born 1959), Scottish former professional football player and manager
Archibald McLeish (1892–1982), American poet, writer, and the Librarian of Congress
Cindy McLeish (born 1962), Australian politician, member for Seymour in the Victorian Legislative Assembly since 2010
David McLeish (Australian footballer) (born 1950), former Australian rules footballer
Henry McLeish (born 1948), Scottish Labour Party politician, author and academic
Hugh McLeish (born 1948), Scottish former professional footballer
Iona McLeish, London Theatre Award-winning British theatre designer and author
Sue McLeish (born 1954), retired field hockey player from New Zealand

See also
McLeish Executive or Government of the 1st Scottish Parliament, formed following the 1999 election
MacLeish (disambiguation)
McLish